August Hermenegilde Cabrinha (April 13, 1902 – March 8, 1979) was an American football wingback for the Dayton Triangles of the National Football League. He played college football at Dayton.

Early life 
Cabrinha was born on April 13, 1902, in Honomu, Hawaii, to Portuguese parents.

Cabrinha was a member of the Boy Scouts. He attended Saint Louis School in Honolulu, at the time known as Saint Louis College, where he played football. He graduated from the school in 1923.

College career 
Cabrinha attended the University of Dayton from 1923 to 1927, where he was known as "Cabby." He played football for the Dayton Flyers from 1924 to 1926, scoring 121 points in total over those three years. Among his football teammates was Walter "Sneeze" Achiu, who he had also played with during his days at Saint Louis.

Cabrinha was also a track runner at Dayton in 1926 and 1927, serving as captain in his final year. He was named first athlete of the year in 1927 and graduated with a degree in civil engineering.

He was inducted into the Dayton Hall of Fame in 1974, the same year as Achiu.

NFL career 
In 1927, Cabrinha became the first Hawaiian-born player in the NFL when he joined the Dayton Triangles. As a Triangle, he was again teammates with Achiu, with both playing wingback.

Cabrinha played three games with the Triangles in 1927, starting one. The first of these appearances was in the team's first game of the season, a September 18 matchup against the Green Bay Packers. The Triangles lost this game 14–0.

Later life

Brief coaching career 
Cabrinha taught at Chaminade Julienne High School in 1927 and coached the Chaminade Eagles while there. He returned to Hawaii in 1928 due to his father becoming ill.

Military service 
In the 1930s, Cabrinha served in the 299th Infantry of the Hawaii National Guard.

During World War II, Cabrinha served in the United States Army and attained the rank of captain. He participated in the Battle of Saipan.

Family 
Cabrinha's younger brother, Joe, was also a Saint Louis School and Dayton Flyers football player, serving as the Flyers' captain in 1930.

August Cabrinha and his first wife Talula (née Hayselden) had two sons, Alvin and James. After Talula's death in 1961, Cabrinha married his second wife, Virginia. Virginia died on November 15, 1978, less than four months before Cabrinha.

Cabrinha was also the uncle of NBA player Red Rocha.

Death 
Cabrinha died on March 8, 1979, in Honolulu, at the age of 76. He is buried in the National Memorial Cemetery of the Pacific.

References

External links 

 August H. Cabrinha at Find a Grave

1902 births
1979 deaths
American football running backs
American people of Portuguese descent
Dayton Flyers football players
Dayton Triangles players
Players of American football from Hawaii
Saint Louis School alumni
Sportspeople from Honolulu

United States Army officers